A white elephant sale is a collection of used items being sold, much akin to a yard sale or garage sale, often as a fund-raiser for a cause.

Etymology
The term "white elephant" refers to an extravagant but burdensome gift that cannot be easily disposed of, based on the legend of the King of Siam giving rare albino elephants to courtiers who had displeased him, that they might be ruined by the animals' upkeep costs.

A "white elephant sale" sells items that retain some value but have no intrinsic use; items are often referred to as white elephants. Such items may still find buyers but their resale value is hard to estimate.

Description
White elephant sales are typically organized by non-profit organizations such as churches and schools to raise money for a charity cause or a special occasion like Easter or Mother's Day. They operate in a manner similar to many non-profit thrift shops. Members or friends of the organization holding the white elephant sale will donate old items which they no longer use, or otherwise no longer care to own.

After items have been collected, a sale will be held, usually lasting more than one day in a public fête style. Volunteers often run checkouts, and organize the items to be sold. Items are sold at low prices, as many are obsolete, or useful to only certain people, and would not otherwise be sold.

White elephant sales are often useful to buyers and collectors, because they provide a way to purchase older and harder to find items. In the days before online auction and trading websites, white elephant sales, along with thrift stores, yard sales and pawn shops were popular ways to procure collectibles and odd items not available in retail stores.

Drawbacks
Problems can arise with white elephant sales in that a great deal of space is required to hold items to be sold. Even more problematic is many items will not be sold one year, but in the case of an annual sale, will be retained to be sold the next year. This requires a large amount of space to be dedicated to the extended storage of the items.

Other problems include the inability to move merchandise, or the little money produced by the sale, despite its low (or nonexistent) initial investment. Additionally, many items donated are often not worth selling, as they are broken, or clearly worthless, and donated only so the previous owner can dispense with them.

White elephant sales also often carry the reputation of selling kitsch items.

See also
Jumble sale
White elephant gift exchange

References

Reuse
Retail formats